Modernday Folklore is the second studio album by Ian Moore and was released in 1995. The album peaked at No. 14 on the ''Billboard Top Heatseekers chart.

Track listing 
All songs by Ian Moore, except where noted

 "Muddy Jesus" - 4:52
 "Society" - 4:11
 "Today" - 5:05
 "Daggers" - 2:01
 "Bar Line 99" - 4:21
 "Dandelion" - 3:52
 "Lie" - 5:45
 "Train Tracks" - 4:06
 "Monday Afternoon" - 2:28
 "You'll Be Gone" - 5:17 (Ian Moore, Bukka Allen)
 "Stain" - 5:30
 "Morning Song" - 6:04
 "Home" - 2:10

Personnel 
 Ian Moore - Guitar, Vocals, Sitar, Percussion
 Chris White - Bass, Background Vocals, Percussion
 Bukka Allen - Piano, Organ, Percussion
 Michael Villegas - Drums, Percussion
 Sass Jordan - Vocals on "Stain" and "Lie"
 Flaco Jiménez - Accordion on "Muddy Jesus"
 Daryl Johnson - Vocals on "Stain" and "Lie"
 Tim Green - Saxophone
 Reggie Houston - Baritone Saxophone
 Renard Poché - Trombone
 Stacey Cole - Trumpet
 Irene Sazer - Violin
 Katrina Wreede - Viola
 Julian Smedley - Violin
 Dan Reiter - Cello

References 

1995 albums
Ian Moore (musician) albums
Capricorn Records albums